Koila may refer to several places:

Koila, village in Karnataka, India
Koila, Harju County, village in Jõelähtme Parish, Harju County, Estonia
Koila, Väike-Maarja Parish, village in Väike-Maarja Parish, Lääne-Viru County, Estonia
Koila, Viru-Nigula Parish, village in Viru-Nigula Parish, Lääne-Viru County, Estonia
Koila (Arcadia), an ancient town of Arcadia, Greece
Koila, Kozani, village in the municipality of Kozani, Greece